Carukia is a genus of box jellyfish in the Carukiidae family.

Species
The World Register of Marine Species lists the following two species:
Carukia barnesi Southcott, 1967
Carukia shinju Gershwin, 2005

References

Carukiidae
Medusozoa genera